Chunian , is a historic city and the capital of Chunian Tehsil of Punjab, Pakistan. It is located at 30° 58' N 73° 51' E and at an elevation of 177 metres (583 feet), and lies about 70 km south of Lahore the Punjab capital.  It is the headquarters of a tehsil or revenue sub-division of the same name in Kasur District. Before 1976 this city is the part or tehsil of Lahore District. The city is administratively subdivided into two union councils.

Chunian city (1998 census pop. 47,600) is located on the Pattoki-Kasur Road at an important junction of local roads. The city is located on the right bank of the former Beas River bed. Beas changed its course several centuries ago.

Some important places around Chunian includes Dhose, Sadha otar, Gurdas Walla, Bhemkie, Charkey, Kott Ch. Allah Ditta, Ellah Abad and Gehlan Hithar. Gehlan Hithar has almost 400 years of rich cultural history.

Economy

The tehsil is known for the Changa Manga forest, the largest single plantation of trees in Pakistan, and the Chunian Industrial Estate, one of the largest concentrations of manufacturing in the country near Kashif Chok (Kashif Petrolium) bypass Chunian. The city is a busy regional market for agricultural produce. In 2016, the Government of Pakistan created an industrial zone on the outskirts of the city to provide a boost to the local economy.

History
The present city is more than 500 years old. Some parts of the city fortification and several of its old gates still exist. The city is built on a mound thought to have been built by the Harappan or Indus Valley civilisation. Very little excavation has sought to confirm this. the Archeology Department, Government of Pakistan carried out the last excavation in 1978. Among other objects, coins dating back to Alexander the Great's time (c. 323 BC) were discovered at the site. A large area of unexcavated mounds extends to the south-west of the city where ancient bricks and shards of pottery can be found on the surface. Popular legend holds that the city has been destroyed nine times in the past. The present name is popularly believed to have been derived from 'Chunni', name of a daughter of Raja Todar Mal, the dewan or revenue minister to Mughal Emperor Akbar the Great. Little historical evidence of this belief has been documented. People of nearby villages call the city Chooni in local dialect of Punjabi.
There is a baradari in Chunian of Raja Todar Mal.

Climate

References

Populated places in Kasur District